James Quigg Newton Jr. (August 3, 1911 – April 4, 2003) was an American lawyer and politician who served as the mayor of Denver, Colorado from 1947 to 1955.

Newton was born in Denver; his father was a businessman there. Newton was educated in Denver and then studied at Yale Law School. He worked for the Denver law firm of Lewis & Grant before founding his own law firm. His firm merged with Lewis & Grant in 1947 to form Lewis, Grant, Newton, Davis & Henry, which later became Lewis, Grant & Davis, and then Davis Graham & Stubbs. His colleague and Yale classmate Richard Davis married his sister Nancy.

Newton served as a legal officer in the US Navy in the Second World War. He married Virginia Shafroth in 1942; she was the granddaughter of John F. Shafroth who served as US Senator and Governor of Colorado. They had four daughters.

In 1947, aged 35, he ran for the office of mayor, and defeated the incumbent, Benjamin F. Stapleton, who first became mayor in 1923. Newton was reelected in 1951, but declined to run for a third term in 1955.

After leaving office as mayor, and spending time as a vice-president of the Ford Foundation, he was president of the University of Colorado from 1956 to 1963. He served on the Republican National Committee. He was president of the Commonwealth Fund in New York from 1963 to 1976, and then spent time in California. He returned to practice law at Davis Graham & Stubbs from 1981 to his death in 2003. Newton was the first mayor of Denver to have been born in the city.

References

Mayors of Denver
Colorado Republicans
1911 births
2003 deaths
Military personnel from Colorado
Leaders of the University of Colorado Boulder
20th-century American politicians
United States Navy personnel of World War II
United States Navy officers
20th-century American academics